Armação dos Búzios, often referred to as just Búzios, is a resort town and a municipality located in the state of Rio de Janeiro, Brazil. It is 173 km east of the city of Rio de Janeiro. By 2020, its population consisted of 34,477 inhabitants and its area of 71 km2. Today, Búzios is a popular getaway from the city and a worldwide tourist site, especially among Brazilians and Argentinians.

Búzios remained almost unknown until 1964, when the French actress Brigitte Bardot visited the small village.   Since then, in Búzios became popular with the Carioca's high society, who wanted to escape from the city life of Rio de Janeiro and enjoy over 23 beaches the peninsula offers. The town eventually grew to be an international tourist destination.

The peninsula's west coast beaches offer calm, clear waters while the east coast ones, facing the open sea, are more wild and draw surfers and water sports enthusiasts. Azeda, Ferradura, João Fernandes and Armação are amongst the most popular beaches in town. At night, Rua das Pedras, Buzios' main street, offers its visitors an active nightlife and a great variety of shopping and restaurants.

History 
During the 16th century, the Tupinambá Indians occupied the area, which is now known as Búzios. During the 17th century, the Europeans invaded what was then a small village and as a result, the Tupinambá developed strict relationships with the French pirates and smugglers, who were interested in smuggling pau-brasil (Brazilian reddish wood) and selling African Slaves. Eventually the French were expelled by the Portuguese due to their bloody disputes with the Tupinambás, which resulted in a significant decrease in the Indian population in that region.

In the 18th century, the gold trade from Minas Gerais and its exportation to Europe from Rio de Janeiro attracted many ships to the Guanabara Bay. Additionally the increasing number of ships along the city's coast brought close attention to the whale hunting practice that took place in that area. The name "Armação dos Búzios", for instance, comes from the process of separating the meat from the bones. In addition, a beach in Búzios called "Praia dos Ossos" was named after the great amount of whales' bones found along the shore. Another curious fact about this practice at the time was that the city lights were fueled with whale oil, and the Sant'Ana Chapel located on the top of a hill between Praia dos Ossos and Praia da Armação, was built with rocks and whale oil as well.

Around 1850 when slave trade was abolished in Brazil, Búzios was able to establish itself as a city that cultivated agricultural and fishing habits, instead of being just a smuggling, slave-trading and whale-hunting site. With time, the once European dominated city, shifted into a community composed by a mix of native descendants, blacks and interracial citizens. In 1940, Antonio Alipio da Silva was the first political representative to initiate a political life in Búzios. As a consequence, the small town started to grow and attract a greater variety of people. During the mid-1900s, Búzios was already known to Rio's high society, as it was a relatively reserved beach getaway from the chaotic urban life. However, it was only around 1964, when Brigitte Bardot visited the small town, that Búzios actually became well known.

Brigitte Bardot
Brigitte Bardot was a French actress in the 1960s that decided to go to Rio with her Brazilian boyfriend, Bob Zagury. However, due to the intense amount of paparazzi following them, Bob took his girlfriend to Búzios in order to enjoy the rest of their trip at a quieter and more exclusive site. At the time, the small town had no electricity and life there was quite bucolic yet it was the simplicity of the place, in conjunction with the peninsula's natural beauty, that made Brigitte Bardot declare her admiration. Inevitably, Búzios became a global spotlight and although other stars like Mick Jagger and Madonna followed her path, none left as much of an impression as Bardot.
The place where she stayed in Búzios for the first time is now a small hotel, known as Pousada do Sol. The strip of land that connects Praia da Armação with one of the main streets in town, Rua das Pedras, was named after her, Orla Bardot. She was also honored along the oceanfront path with a bronze statue made by Christina Motta. The final tribute is the only cinema in the balneary named after her: Gran Cine Bardot. Inside, there are many pictures of actors and actresses, including Brigitte's picture and signature, which hangs on a distinctive wall.

Main sights 
 Capela de Nossa Senhora Desatadora de Nós (Chapel Mary Untier of Knots)

Geography 

Armação dos Búzios is located in the state of Rio de Janeiro, Brazil, in an area known as Região dos Lagos. The peninsula of 8 kilometers in extension features 23 beaches: Geribá, Tartaruga, João Fernandes, João Fernandinho, Ferradura, Ferradurinha, Azeda, Azedinha, Ossos, Manguinhos, Tucuns, Brava, Amores, Armação, Forno, Foca, Olho de Boi, Caravelas, José Gonçalves, Virgens, Canto, Rasa, Moças.

Climate
Búzios has a tropical climate and temperatures in the southern hemisphere tend to vary between 30 °C during the months of November and February, and around 20 C from May to September. Ocean breezes are common all year round, but are more frequent and stronger during the winter. Most rainfall is seen in Jan, Feb, Mar, Nov and Dec. Buzios has dry periods in June and August.

Transportation
Búzios is served by Umberto Modiano Airport which operates flights of general aviation. There are regular buses that travel to Búzios from Rio de Janeiro and other cities of the region.

Gallery

Entertainment
Common outdoor activities include snorkeling, hiking, fishing, scuba diving, tanning, and beach hopping on aqua taxi or buggies. Rua das Pedras, literally translated as "Stone Street", is the center of the city life, featuring a variety of stores, restaurants, clubs, bars and art galleries.

Restaurants include Chez Michou, the busiest place to eat French-style crepes and drink caipirinhas in town; Satyricon specialized in sea food; Pizzeria Capricciosa, located side-by-side with Satyricon yet specialized in Italian food. Sollar, located in the beginning of the Orla Bardot, which features the Italian chef Danio Braga.
Nightlife in Búzios is serviced by clubs/bars like: The House of Rock and Roll, Privilège, Pacha, Anexo and Zapata. In terms of what to wear, women are usually dressed in flat sandals due to the difficulty to walk on the cobblestone streets.

Also on Rua das Pedras, there are stores such as Animale, Richards, Osklen, Oh Boy!, Maria Filó, Lacoste, Farm, Eclectic Havainas, Salinas, Lenny Niemeyer, Banco de Areia, Bum Bum and Água de Coco.

Notable people
Lenny Lobato, footballer

References

External links

Populated coastal places in Rio de Janeiro (state)
Municipalities in Rio de Janeiro (state)